Kampong Tasek Meradun is a village in Brunei-Muara District, Brunei, as well as a neighbourhood in the capital Bandar Seri Begawan. The population was 400 in 2016. It is one of the villages within Mukim Kilanas. The postcode is BF1520.

See also 
 List of neighbourhoods in Bandar Seri Begawan

References 

Villages in Brunei-Muara District
Neighbourhoods in Bandar Seri Begawan